Best is a 2000 British film portraying the football career of the Northern Irish soccer star George Best, particularly his years spent at Manchester United. It was directed by Mary McGuckian.

Cast
 John Lynch as George Best
 Ian Bannen as Sir Matt Busby
 Jerome Flynn as Bobby Charlton
 Ian Hart as Nobby Stiles 
 Patsy Kensit as Angie Best
 Cal Macaninch as Paddy
 Linus Roache as Denis Law
 Adrian Lester as Rocky
 David Hayman as Tommy Docherty, The Barman
 Philip Madoc as Jimmy Murphy
 Jim Sheridan as Bob Bishop
 James Ellis as Dickie Beal
 Roger Daltrey as Rodney Marsh
 Clive Anderson as Interviewer
 Sophie Dahl as Eva Haraldsted
 Stephen Fry as Frazer Crane
 Dave Duffy as Limousine Driver
 Neil Caple as The Barber
 Nick Wall as Photographer
 John McCarthy as Hairdresser
 Nick Woolham as #1 Boy Autograph Hunter

Filming locations
 Isle of Man
 Liverpool, Merseyside, England
 Saints RLFC, Knowsley Road, St Helens, Merseyside, England

Release dates
 UK - 1 May 2000 (Belfast Premiere)
 UK - 12 May 2000 (General Release)
 Israel - 1 June 2000
 USA - 15 September 2000 (Temecula Valley International Film Festival)
 Iceland - 28 March 2001 (Video Premiere)
 Singapore - 26 July 2001
 Italy - 10 May 2002
 Netherlands - 6 April 2004 (DVD Premiere)

Reception
Ian Nathan of Empire magazine gave it 2 out of 5.

Awards

Ft. Lauderdale International Film Festival
Best Actor - John Lynch (tied with Dirk Roofthooft and Pleure pas Germaine)

Temecula Valley International Film Festival
Best Foreign Film - Mary McGuckain

References

External links
 

2000 films
Northern Irish films
British biographical films
British association football films
2000s biographical films
Biographical films about sportspeople
Cultural depictions of association football players
Cultural depictions of Irish men
George Best
2000s English-language films
2000s British films